Phytanoyl-CoA hydroxylase-interacting protein-like is an enzyme that in humans is encoded by the PHYHIPL gene.

References

Further reading